Cylichna is a genus of sea snails or bubble snails, marine gastropod molluscs in the family Cylichnidae, the "chalice bubble snails".

Species
Species within the genus Cylichna include:

 Cylichna aethiopica
 Cylichna affinis
 Cylichna alba (T. Brown, 1827) - white chalice-bubble
 Cylichna algoensis
 Cylichna andersoni
 Cylichna arthuri Dautzenberg, 1929
 Cylichna atahualpa (Dall, 1908)
 Cylichna ationsa
 Cylichna atlantica E. A. Smith, 1890
 Cylichna attanosa
 Cylichna attonsa Carpenter, 1865
 Cylichna auberii (d'Orbigny, 1841)
 Cylichna aula
 Cylichna biplicata (A. Adams in Sowerby, 1850)
 Cylichna brevissima
 Cylichna bruguierei
 Cylichna chevreuxi Dautzenberg, 1889
 Cylichna collyra Melvill, 1906
 Cylichna costata
 Cylichna crebripunctata (Jeffreys, 1881)
 Cylichna crispula
 Cylichna crossei Bucquoy, Dautzenberg & Dollfus, 1886
 Cylichna cumberlandiana (Strebel, 1908)
 Cylichna cylindracea (Pennant, 1777)
 Cylichna dalli A. E. Verrill, 1882
 Cylichna diegensis (Dall, 1919) - San Diego chalice-bubble
 Cylichna discus Watson, 1886
 Cylichna dulcis Thiele, 1925
 Cylichna eburnea A. E. Verrill, 1885 - ivory chalice-bubble
 Cylichna erecta Hedley, 1899 (taxon inquirendum)
 Cylichna euthlasta Melvill, 1918
 Cylichna fantasma (Baker and Hanna, 1927)
 Cylichna gelida (Smith, 1907)
 Cylichna georgiana (Strebel, 1908)
 Cylichna gouldii (Couthouy, 1839)
 Cylichna grovesi Valdès, 2008
 Cylichna inca (Dall, 1908)
 Cylichna intermissia curta
 Cylichna involuta
 Cylichna jaba
 Cylichna krebsii Mörch, 1875
 Cylichna lemchei Bouchet & Warén, 1979
 Cylichna linearis Jeffreys, 1867 - lined chalice-bubble
 Cylichna luticola (C. B. Adams, 1852)
 Cylichna magna Lemche, 1941
 Cylichna modesta
 Cylichna mongii (Audouin, 1826)
 Cylichna nida
 Cylichna nipponensis Nomura & Hatai, 1940
 Cylichna nucleola (Reeve, 1855) - kernel chalice-bubble
 Cylichna obscura Sykes, 1903
 Cylichna occulta (Mighels and C. B. Adams, 1842) - concealed chalice-bubble
 Cylichna occulta densistriata
 Cylichna orycta (Watson, 1883)
 Cylichna oryza
 Cylichna ovata Jeffreys, 1871
 Cylichna parallela
 Cylichna parvula Jeffreys, 1883
 Cylichna petiti Dautzenberg, 1923
 Cylichna piettei Dautzenberg & Fischer H., 1896
 Cylichna pizarro (Dall, 1908)
 Cylichna propecylindracea (de Gregorio, 1890)
 Cylichna protracta
 Cylichna proxima
 Cylichna pumila
 Cylichna pusilla
 Cylichna quercinensis
 Cylichna remissa E. A. Smith, 1890
 Cylichna secalina
 Cylichna similis
 Cylichna stephensae Strong & Hertlein, 1939
 Cylichna striata
 Cylichna subcylindrica
 Cylichna sundaica
 Cylichna tanyumphalos Valdès, 2008
 Cylichna tenuissima
 Cylichna thetidis Hedley, 1903
 Cylichna tubulosa Gould, 1859
 Cylichna umbilicata
 Cylichna veleronis Strong & Hertlein, 1939
 Cylichna verrillii Dall, 1889
 Cylichna vortex (Dall, 1881)
 Cylichna zealandica T.W. Kirk, 1880

Species brought into synonymy
 Cylichna arachis (Quoy & Gaimard, 1833): synonym of Adamnestia arachis (Quoy & Gaimard, 1833)
 Cylichna atkinsoni Tenison-Woods, 1876: synonym of Retusa atkinsoni (Tenison-Woods, 1876)
 Cylichna atyoides Thiele, 1925: synonym of Sphaerocylichna atyoides (Thiele, 1925)
 Cylichna bizona (A. Adams, 1850): synonym of Mnestia bizona (A. Adams, 1850)
 Cylichna bulloides Dell, 1956: synonym of Sphaerocylichna incommoda (E. A. Smith, 1891)
 Cylichna consobrina Gould, 1859: synonym of Cylichna alba (Brown, 1827)
 Cylichna cylindrica (Bruguière, 1792): synonym of Cylichna cylindracea (Pennant, 1777)
 Cylichna densistriata Leche, 1878: synonym of Cylichnoides densistriata (Leche, 1878)
 Cylichna elongata Locard, 1886: synonym of Cylichna cylindracea (Pennant, 1777)
 Cylichna girardi (Audouin, 1826): synonym of Cylichnina girardi (Audouin, 1826); synonym of Retusa girardi (Audouin, 1826)
 Cylichna grimaldii Dautzenberg: synonym of Cylichnatys grimaldii (Dautzenberg, 1891)
 Cylichna hoernesii: synonym of Pyrunculus hoernesii (Weinkauff, 1866)
 Cylichna incisula Yokoyama, 1928: synonym of Liloa porcellana (Gould, 1859)
 Cylichna laevisculpta Granata-Grillo, 1877: synonym of Cylichnina laevisculpta (Granata-Grillo, 1877); synonym of Retusa laevisculpta (Granata-Grillo, 1877)
 Cylichna mongei (Audouin, 1826): synonym of Cylichna mongii (Audouin, 1826)
 Cylichna nitidula Lovén, 1846: synonym of Cylichnina nitidula (Lovén, 1846); synonym of Retusa nitidula (Lovén, 1846)
 Cylichna nucleolus (Reeve, 1855): synonym of Cylichna nucleola (Reeve, 1855)
 Cylichna occulata: synonym of Cylichna occulta (Mighels & Adams, 1842)
 Cylichna producta (Brown, 1827): synonym of Cylichna cylindracea (Pennant, 1777)
 Cylichna propinqua M. Sars, 1858: synonym of Cylichna occulta (Mighels & Adams, 1842)
 Cylichna protumida Hedley, 1903: synonym of Retusa protumida (Hedley, 1903)
 Cylichna scalpta Reeve, 1855: synonym of Cylichna occulta (Mighels & Adams, 1842)
 Cylichna semisulcata Dunker, 1882: synonym of Liloa porcellana (Gould, 1859)
 Cylichna spreta Watson, 1897: synonym of Pyrunculus spretus (Watson, 1897)
 Cylichna strigella (A. Adams, 1850): synonym of Cylichna arthuri Dautzenberg, 1929
 Cylichna sumatrana Thiele, 1925: synonym of Relichna sumatrana (Thiele, 1925)
 Cylichna tayamaensis Habe, 1955: synonym of Cylichna alba (Brown, 1827)
 Cylichna venustula A. Adams, 1862: synonym of Relichna venustula (A. Adams, 1862)

References

 
 ZipCodeZoo
 Powell A. W. B., New Zealand Mollusca, William Collins Publishers Ltd, Auckland, New Zealand 1979

External links
 Miocene Gastropods and Biostratigraphy of the Kern River Area, California; United States Geological Survey Professional Paper 642 

Cylichnidae
Gastropod genera